Lyona is an unincorporated community in Liberty Township, Dickinson County, Kansas, United States.

History
Lyona once had a post office; it closed in 1888.

Education
The community is served by Chapman USD 473 public school district.

References

Further reading

 The Story of the Valley Called Lyona, Vol. 1; Lyona United Methodist Church; 1984.

External links
 County’s oldest church celebrates 160 years
 Dickinson County website
 Dickinson County maps: Current, Historic, KDOT

Unincorporated communities in Dickinson County, Kansas
Unincorporated communities in Kansas
Populated places established in 1853